Thomas Henry Potts (23 November 1824 – 27 July 1888) was a British-born New Zealand naturalist, ornithologist, entomologist, and botanist. He also served in the New Zealand Parliament from 1866 to 1870.

Biography

The son of a small arms manufacturer, he emigrated to New Zealand in 1854, and recorded many natural observations as well as species that were then new to science, such as the black-billed gull and the great spotted kiwi.

In  he was elected to the Mount Herbert electorate after William Sefton Moorhouse who had won the seat in the 1866 general election declined the seat. Potts retired from Parliament in 1870.

In the 1860s and 1870s, Thomas Potts was an early campaigner for areas of New Zealand to be set aside as nature reserves to save many bird species from extinction, after the deforestation of large areas of mainland New Zealand. Potts owned Ohinetahi for several years.

References

External links
Digitized works by Thomas Henry Potts at Biodiversity Heritage Library
Thomas Henry Potts in New Zealand birds website
Potts, Thomas Henry in 1966 Encyclopaedia of New Zealand

1824 births
1888 deaths
New Zealand entomologists
New Zealand ornithologists
Members of the New Zealand House of Representatives
Members of the Canterbury Provincial Council
New Zealand MPs for South Island electorates
19th-century New Zealand politicians
Botanists with author abbreviations
New Zealand naturalists